The 2016–17 CONCACAF Champions League (officially the 2016–17 Scotiabank CONCACAF Champions League for sponsorship reasons) was the 9th edition of the CONCACAF Champions League under its current name, and overall the 52nd edition of the premier football club competition organized by CONCACAF, the regional governing body of North America, Central America, and the Caribbean.

Pachuca won their fifth title, and their first since 2009–10, by defeating UANL 2–1 on aggregate in the final. As the winner of the 2016–17 CONCACAF Champions League, Pachuca qualified as the CONCACAF representative at the 2017 FIFA Club World Cup in the United Arab Emirates. América won the previous two tournaments, but did not qualify for this tournament and were unable to defend their title.

Qualification

A total of 24 teams participated in the CONCACAF Champions League: nine from the North American Zone (from three associations), twelve from the Central American Zone (from at most seven associations), and three from the Caribbean Zone (from at most three associations). Therefore, a maximum of 13 out of the 41 CONCACAF member associations could participate in the tournament.

Clubs could be disqualified and replaced by a club from another association if the club did not have an available stadium that met CONCACAF regulations for safety. If a club's own stadium failed to meet the set standards then it could find a suitable replacement stadium within its own country. However, if it was still determined that the club could not provide the adequate facilities then it ran the risk of being replaced.

North America
Nine teams from the North American Football Union (NAFU) qualified to the Champions League. The allocation to the three NAFU member associations was as follows: four berths for each of Mexico and the United States, and one berth for Canada.

For Mexico, the winners and runners-up of the Liga MX Apertura and Clausura tournaments earned berths in Pot 3 of the tournament's group stage. If a team reached both tournament finals, the vacated berth was reallocated using a formula, based on regular season records, that ensured that two teams qualified via each tournament.

For the United States, three berths were allocated through the Major League Soccer (MLS) regular season and playoffs, to the MLS Cup winners and the regular season Eastern Conference and Western Conference winners (if U.S.-based); the fourth berth was allocated to the winner of its domestic cup competition, the U.S. Open Cup. All four teams were placed in Pot 3. If a team qualified through multiple berths, or if any of the MLS berths were taken by a Canada-based MLS team, the berth was reallocated to the best U.S.-based team in the Supporters' Shield table which had failed to otherwise qualify.

For Canada, the winners of the domestic cup competition, the Voyageurs Cup (competed for in the Canadian Championship), earned the lone Canadian berth into the tournament, in Pot 2 (moved from Pot 1 in the previous edition).

Central America
Twelve teams from the Central American Football Union (UNCAF) qualified to the Champions League. The allocation to the seven UNCAF member associations was as follows: two berths for each of Costa Rica, Honduras, Guatemala, Panama and El Salvador, and one berth for each of Nicaragua and Belize. The teams from Costa Rica, Honduras, Guatemala, and the first team from Panama were placed in Pot 2, and the second team from Panama and the teams from El Salvador, Nicaragua, and Belize were placed in Pot 1 (second team from Panama moved from Pot 2 in the previous edition).

All of these leagues employed a split season with two tournaments in one year, so both tournament champions qualified if there were two available berths (if the same team won both tournaments, the runner-up with the better aggregate record also qualified), or the champion with the better aggregate record qualified if there was only one available berth.

If one or more clubs was precluded, it was supplanted by a club from another Central American association. The reallocation was based on results from previous Champions League tournaments.

Caribbean
Three teams from the Caribbean Football Union (CFU) qualified to the Champions League. The three berths, in Pot 1, were allocated to the top three finishers of the CFU Club Championship, a subcontinental tournament open to clubs from the 31 CFU member associations. In order for a team to qualify for the CFU Club Championship, they usually needed to finish as the champions or runners-up of their respective association's league in the previous season, but professional teams could also be selected by their associations if they played in the league of another country.

If any Caribbean club was precluded, it was supplanted by the fourth-place finisher from the CFU Club Championship.

Teams
The following 24 teams (from 12 associations) qualified for the tournament.

In the following table, the number of appearances, last appearance, and previous best result count only those in the CONCACAF Champions League era starting from 2008–09 (not counting those in the era of the Champions' Cup from 1962 to 2008).

Draw

Schedule
The schedule of the competition was as follows.

Group stage

Group A

Group B

Group C

Group D

Group E

Group F

Group G

Group H

Knockout stage

Seeding

Bracket

Quarter-finals

Semi-finals

Final

Top goalscorers

Awards

Prize money
The four semi-finalists received prize money from CONCACAF.

See also
2017 FIFA Club World Cup

References

External links
CONCACAF Champions League , CONCACAF.com

 
1
CONCACAF Champions League seasons